"Because of Love" is a 1993 song by Janet Jackson. It may also refer to:

 "Because of Love" (Elvis Presley song), 1962 song by Elvis Presley
 "Because of Love", a 1962 single by Billy Fury, recorded later, but released first
 "Because of Love", a 2008 song from My Friend (SG Wannabe album)
 "Because of Love", a 2011 song by Han Seung-yeon for the Korean television series, Warrior Baek Dong-soo
 Dahil Sa Pag-ibig, a 2012 Philippine television series, also called Because of Love in English